Cristobal Colon may refer to:

The Spanish name of the explorer known in English as Christopher Columbus
Spanish cruiser Cristobal Colon (1887), an unprotected Spanish cruiser that foundered off Cuba in 1895
Spanish cruiser Cristóbal Colón, a Spanish armoured cruiser that fought in the Battle of Santiago de Cuba during the Spanish–American War in 1898
Spanish frigate Cristóbal Colón, a 2010 Spanish air defence frigate of the Álvaro de Bazán class
Cristóbal, Colón, a port on the Atlantic side of the Panama Canal
Pico Cristóbal Colón, the highest mountain in Colombia
Cristóbal Colón Ruiz (born 1954), Puerto Rican politician

Christopher Columbus was supposed to go to Asia but instead discovered America